Volodymyr Volodymyrovych Brazhko (born 23 January 2002) is a Ukrainian professional footballer who plays as a defensive midfielder for Zorya Luhansk on loan from Dynamo Kyiv.

Career

Early years
Born in Zaporizhzhia, Brazhko began his career at Metalurh Zaporizhzhia from native city and then continued in the Dynamo Kyiv academy.

Dynamo Kyiv
He played in the Ukrainian Premier League Reserves and never made his debut for the senior Dynamo Kyiv squad.

Loan to Zorya Luhansk
In July 2022 Brazhko signed a one-year loan contract with Ukrainian Premier League side Zorya Luhansk and made his debut for this club in the Ukrainian Premier League as a second half-time substituted player in a home winning match against Vorskla Poltava on 23 August 2022.

References

External links
 
 

2002 births
Living people
Footballers from Zaporizhzhia
Ukrainian footballers
Ukraine youth international footballers
Ukraine under-21 international footballers
Association football midfielders
FC Dynamo Kyiv players
FC Zorya Luhansk players
Ukrainian Premier League players